General Hong Dalson (hangul:홍달손, hanja:洪達孫, 1415–1472) was a politician and soldier of the Joseon period of Korea. His courtesy name was Gachik(가칙 可則). He was part of the plots which instated King Sejo on his throne (계유정난). As a result, he was nominated as the #10 in the 1st rank gongsin of 1453 and the #10 in the 2nd rank gongsin of 1455, with the title Prince Namyang (남양군).
  
In 1459, he was promoted to Internal Prince Namyang 남양부원군 南陽府院君. Under Sejo, Yejong and Seongjong, he occupied many gouvernemental posts, Left State Councilor (좌위정) among them (1467–1472).

References

External links 
 Hong Dalson 
 Hong Dalson 
 Hong Dalson  
 Hong Dalson 
 Hong Dalson 

1417 births
1472 deaths
15th-century Korean people
Korean generals